This article describes the state of race relations and racism in North America. Racism manifests itself in different ways and severities throughout North America depending on the country. Colonial processes shaped the continent culturally, demographically, religiously, economically, and linguistically. Racism was part of this process and is exemplified throughout North America today, but varies regionally.

Canada 

In a 2013 survey of 80 countries by the World Values Survey, Canada was ranked among the most racially tolerant societies in the world. In 2021, the Social Progress Index ranked Canada 6th in the world for overall tolerance and inclusion.

Canadian author and journalist Terry Glavin claims that white Canadians consider themselves to be mostly free of racial prejudice, perceiving the country to be a "more inclusive society" than its direct neighbor the United States, a notion that has come under criticism. For instance, Galvin cites the treatment of the Aboriginal population in Canada as evidence of Canada's own racist tendencies. These perceptions of inclusion and "colour-blindness" have also been challenged in recent years by scholars such as Constance Backhouse stating that white supremacy is still prevalent in the country's legal system, with blatant racism created and enforced through the law. According to one commentator, Canadian "racism contributes to a self-perpetuating cycle of criminalization and imprisonment". In addition, throughout Canada's history there have been laws and regulations that have negatively affected a wide variety of races, religions, and groups of persons.

Canadian law uses the term "visible minority" to refer to people of colour (but not aboriginal Canadians), introduced by the Employment Equity Act of 1995. However, the UN Committee on the Elimination of Racial Discrimination stated this term may be considered objectionable by certain minorities and recommended an evaluation of this term. In response, the Canadian government made efforts to evaluate how this term is used in Canadian society through commissioning of scholars and open workshops.

In 2020, Canadian university students attracted media attention by sharing on Instagram their experiences of racism on campuses. According to Ethnic and Racial studies, Henry and Tator argued that in context of the Canadian universities, they have denied the role of racism in Canadian society and are resistant in the decision of changes which hinders incorporation and equity for students who are aboriginal.

Mexico 

Racism in Mexico has a long history. Historically, Mexicans that were more genetically Spanish, and thus lighter skin tones, had absolute control over dark-skinned Indigenous people. This is evidenced in the Spanish colonial Casta system. Generally, White Mexicans have made up the majority of Mexico's upper class and as such, many White Mexicans feel a sense of superiority over the Amerindian population who tend to be predominantly of low income. In Mexico, people who are darker-skinned or of indigenous descent make up the majority of the working classes, while lighter-skinned Mexicans of Spanish descent typically make up the majority of the upper class. However, there are notable exceptions as most of the poor in the rural north of Mexico are White, whilst in Southern Mexico – particularly in the states of Yucatán and Chiapas – Amerindians and Mestizos make up a large part of the upper class.

In Mexico the most common racism is used towards Mexican families, underlying multiple relational and individual conflicts. Most racist feelings in Mexico are sourced in differentiation from Indians. However, the indigenous people were inhabitants of these ancient territories after being conquered by the Spaniards.

Trinidad and Tobago 
The island nation of Trinidad and Tobago is a place of tension between Afro-Caribbeans and Indo-Caribbeans. Around 39% of Trinidadians are of African descent, 40% are of Indian descent and a small population is of European descent. Africans usually live in urban areas, notably the East–west corridor, while Indians usually live in the rural areas surrounding the sugar cane plantations.

According to W. Chris Johnson, in 1973, a secret wing of Trinidad and Tobago's police ministrations went to war against an equally shadowy group of youthful people called the National United Freedom Fighters. On September 13 of 73, Beverly Jones, soldier of NUFF was killed in a firefight with Trinidad and Tobago's force. Revolutionary young girls and women like Jennifer, Althea, and Beverley Jones battled gender violence and racism that assembled both with and against anti-imperialist movements, where Black men in tradition, "set the agenda and stole the show."

United States

Racism in the United States has been a major issue ever since the era of colonialism and slavery. 12.5 million individuals were abducted from Africa and transported to the Americas via the transatlantic slave trade between 1525 and 1866. Only 10.7 million people made it through the terrifying two-month voyage. Legally sanctioned racism imposed a heavy burden on Native Americans, African Americans, Latino Americans, Americans from lesser developed parts of Europe, and Asian Americans. European Americans were privileged by law in matters of literacy, immigration, voting rights, citizenship, land acquisition, and criminal procedure over periods of time which extended from the 17th century to the 1960s. However, numerous European ethnic groups, including Jews, Irish, Southern European and Eastern European Americans, as well as immigrants from elsewhere, faced xenophobic exclusion and other forms of racism in American society. 

Major racially structured institutions included slavery, Indian Wars, Native American reservations, segregation, residential schools (for Native Americans), and internment camps (for Japanese Americans). Formal racial discrimination was largely banned in the mid-20th century and it came to be perceived as being socially unacceptable and/or morally repugnant as well, yet, racial politics remains a major phenomenon. Historical racism continues to be reflected in socio-economic inequality. Racial stratification continues to occur in employment, housing, education, lending, and government.

As in most countries, many people in the U.S. continue to have some prejudices against other races. In the view of a network of scores of US civil rights and human rights organizations, "Discrimination permeates all aspects of life in the United States, and it extends to all communities of color." Discrimination against African Americans and Latin Americans is widely acknowledged. Members of every major American ethnic and religious minority have perceived discrimination in their dealings with other minority racial and religious groups. Using U.S. Department of Justice statistics to show social justice inequalities, the index found that blacks were more than twice as likely as whites to experience intimidation and violence during police encounters and were more likely to be detained upon arrest. It turned out to be three times more likely. It’s said that in the year of 2020, black people were likely to be victims of hate crime by 93 percent more.

Legal scholar Charles Lawrence, speaking about the American political elite said that their "cultural belief system has influenced all of us; we are all racists". Philosopher Cornel West has stated that "racism is an integral element within the very fabric of American culture and society. It is embedded in the country's first collective definition, enunciated in its subsequent laws, and imbued in its dominant way of life."

Since Puerto Rico is a territory rather than a state, the island is only entitled to receive certain "fundamental" constitutional protections, which is a source of their differential treatment. Holding the status as residents of an incorporated territory, they are limited to certain rights, are unable to vote and are excluded from certain federal entitlements and welfare programs under the 14th Amendment. Furthermore, they hold zero representation in all branches of government, which proposes the application of a heightened judicial view under the equal protection doctrine. The Supreme Court holds the view that Congress may treat Puerto Rico unequally as long as it does so on a rational basis for its actions. Federal courts have relied on this upholding and Puerto Rico's unincorporated territorial status and the resulting systematic inequality in order to deny plaintiff's equal protection lawsuits.

See also

Racism in South America

References

Works cited

 
 
 

 
North America